Gonzo Girl is an upcoming American drama film written by Rebecca Thomas and Jessica Caldwell, directed by Patricia Arquette and starring Camila Morrone, Willem Dafoe and Arquette.  It is based on the 2015 novel of the same title by Cheryl Della Pietra.  It is also Arquette's feature directorial debut.

Cast
Camila Morrone as Alley Russo
Willem Dafoe as Walker Reade
Patricia Arquette as Claudia
Elizabeth Lail as Devaney Peltier
Ray Nicholson as Larry Lukes
Leila George as September McAvoy
Rick Springfield

Production
Production on the film occurred in Utah in August 2022.

References

External links
 

Upcoming films
Films shot in Utah
Films based on American novels